The men's pole vault event  at the 1974 European Athletics Indoor Championships was held on 10 March in Gothenburg.

Results

References

Pole vault at the European Athletics Indoor Championships
Pole